Purani Idgah is an ancient Idgah and mosque located in Hyderabad, Telangana, India. It is on the city's heritage list. The most attractive aspect of Idgah is its two astounding pillars having resemblance to the Charminar.

Trust
Purani Idgah is managed by a trust.

History
Purani Idgah was built in circa 1700.

References

External links
 List of heritage sites

Hyderabad State
Heritage structures in Hyderabad, India
Tourist attractions in Hyderabad, India
Eidgahs